The 1818 Ohio gubernatorial election was held on October 13, 1818.

Incumbent Democratic-Republican Governor Thomas Worthington did not run for re-election.

Chief Judge of the Ohio Supreme Court Ethan Allen Brown defeated former member of the Ohio Legislature James Dunlap.

General election

Results

Notes

References

1818
Ohio
Gubernatorial